Koompassia is a genus of legume in the family Fabaceae occurring in southeast Asia. It belongs to the subfamily Dialioideae. They are tall tropical rainforest trees; K. excelsa is one of the tallest tree species in the tropics.

The genus contains the following three species:
 Koompassia excelsa
 Koompassia grandiflora
 Koompassia malaccensis

References

Dialioideae
Taxonomy articles created by Polbot
Fabaceae genera